"AI Freaks Me Out" is the second single from Double Experience's third studio album Rock (Geology), officially released on February 12, 2018, along with a music video, on March 22, 2018.

Background

On January 22, 2018, Double Experience’s Twitter announced their single and its release date, noting that artificial intelligence was “pushing humanity to the edge of a cliff and staring blankly”.

Music video
On February 11, 2018, Double Experience released a video on their Facebook, featuring Ian Nichols as Max Headroom. A month later, on March 22, the video premiered on the Spaceuntravel YouTube, for worldwide audiences.

Live performances 
The band performed the song live for the first time on March 2, 2018 at a sold-out show in Ottawa, Ontario. To celebrate, Double Experience procured robot-themed cocktails and loot crates for the attendants. A dollar from each ticket was donated to Ingenium.

Track listing

Release history

References

External links

2018 singles
Double Experience songs
2017 songs